In enzymology, a 2-aminohexano-6-lactam racemase is an enzyme that catalyzes the chemical reaction

L-2-aminohexano-6-lactam  D-2-aminohexano-6-lactam

Hence, this enzyme has one substrate, L-2-aminohexano-6-lactam, and one product, D-2-aminohexano-6-lactam.

This enzyme belongs to the family of isomerases, specifically those racemases and epimerases acting on amino acids and derivatives.  The systematic name of this enzyme class is 2-aminohexano-6-lactam racemase. This enzyme is also called alpha-amino-epsilon-caprolactam racemase.

References

 
 

EC 5.1.1
Enzymes of unknown structure